Neranja Manasu is a 2004 Indian Tamil-language action drama film written and directed by Samuthirakani. It stars Vijayakanth and newcomer Susan. The film score is composed by Karthik Raja, while cinematography is by V. Prathap and editing handled by Anil Malnad. The film released on 5 November 2004. It opened to negative reviews and ended as a failure at the box office.

Plot
In Suryakudi, a village in Madurai district, the people stole from neighbouring villages and made a living. The local administration had washed their hands off this hell hole. One day, the thief Irulaiah escaped from the police and left his pregnant wife. Many years later, Irulaiah returned to his village with his new wife and daughter Irulayi. His son Sivanandi killed him to steal his money and his wife died while trying to save him. His cousin Ayyanar, who witnessed it, informed the police and Sivanandi was arrested.

20 years later, Ayyanar is a good samaritan who tries his best to improve the living of the villagers and he is highly respected by his peers. After being released from jail, a vengeful Sivanandi returns to his village and wants to kill his cousin Ayyanar. Meanwhile, Irulayi who is in love with Ayyanar tries to woo him and the new village doctor also likes him.

The village woman Thavamani finds out that the funds meant for the development of the village are being shared by the local bureaucracy led by revenue divisional officer Thirumalaisamy and informs Ayyanar. Thirumalaisamy then murders the innocent Thavamani and a vengeful Ayyanar kills him. Inspector Adithya inquiries the villagers about the murder at the police station and knows that Ayyanar is the culprit. A short-tempered Ayyanar slaps Adithya for threatening the village women and a villager sets the police station on fire and Adithya is disfigured. Later, Sivanandi asks his friend Masanam to marry his sister Irulayi but Ayyanar comes to her rescue and beats up Masanam.

Sivanandi joins hands with Masanam and Adithya to kill Ayyanar. During a fight, Sivanandi is frustrated for not being able to kill Ayyanar and Ayyanar convinces him to become a good man thus Sivanandi has a change of heart. Ayyanar then beats up Masanam and Adithya. The film ends with the collector Venkatraman announcing that the funds will be given to the villagers.

Cast

Vijayakanth as Ayyanar
Soundarya as Irulayi
Mahima as Doctor
Nassar as Venkatraman
Manorama as Ayyanar's grandmother
Ammukutty Pushpamala as Sivanandi's grandmother
Vinu Chakravarthy as Ayyanar's grandfather
Senthil as Ayyanar's uncle
Ilavarasu as Poochi
Sampath Raj as Sivanandi and Irulaiah
Venkat Prabhu as Machakaalai
Mansoor Ali Khan as Masanam
Adithya Menon as Inspector Adithya
M. S. Bhaskar as Nariyan
Muthukaalai as Bodaisamy
Pyramid Natarajan as Thirumalaisamy
Singamuthu as Villager
Peeli Sivam as Superintendent of police 
John Amirtharaj as Government employee
Daniel Lambert as Kutty
Pasi Sathya as Thavamani's mother
Mangai as Thavamani
Kalpanasri as Sivanandi's wife
Sriranjani as Poochi's wife
Srilatha as Irulayi's mother
Sindhu as Sivanandi's mother
Gowthami Vembunathan as Gajalakshmi
Poraali Dileepan as Photographer
Nanditha Jennifer in a special appearance
Samuthirakani as villager (cameo appearance)

Production
After securing Vijayakanth's dates, the producers at GJ Cinema first approached Ramana to direct the film. Ramana finalised a script titled Parthasarathy, but the makers opted to change their choice of director to N. Linguswamy, who also later opted out. Samuthirakani later took on the responsibility, using a different script.

Sampath Raj appeared in his first acting role and portrayed two different characters.

The film was largely shot in a village near Pollachi, including at Mazhai Vendi Ayyanar temple. The film crew got the permission of villagers to repair a broken temple chariot and made the chariot ready to run for the shoot.

Soundtrack

Music was composed by Karthik Raja and released on Mass Audios. Halitha Shameem worked on some lyrics for the film but her contributions were later not included.

Release and reception
S. R. Ashok Kumar of The Hindu opined that "Though the storyline is run-of-the-mill, the treatment and screenplay are worth a mention". A film critic from the portal Indiaglitz noted "the movie could have been much better had the director tried to tell a story rather build a story around a character". A further critic noted "the film, which seems confused about whether it is an action movie or a village movie, is not likely to revive Vijayakanth's fortunes". The film did not perform well commercially.

Samuthirakani later cast both the film's producers Jayaprakash and Gnanavel in his later films.

References

External links
 
 

Indian action drama films
2004 films
Films directed by Samuthirakani
2000s Tamil-language films
Films scored by Karthik Raja
2004 action drama films